The Church of St Andrew in Whitestaunton, Somerset, England, dates from the 13th century and has been designated as a Grade I listed building.

The Perpendicular church is built of Hamstone. It contains a nave and porch which were added in the late 14th century and in the late 15th century it was refenestrated and the north and south chapels added. In the early 16th century the tower and chancel arch were rebuilt, the south chapel widened and the west door added. Further restoration followed in 1882-3 and 1913.

The interior includes a Norman font.

In 2012 an appeal was launched to repair the bellframe in the tower.

See also

 List of Grade I listed buildings in South Somerset
 List of towers in Somerset
 List of ecclesiastical parishes in the Diocese of Bath and Wells

References

13th-century church buildings in England
Church of England church buildings in South Somerset
Grade I listed churches in Somerset
Grade I listed buildings in South Somerset